Geoff Schroeder is a state senator in the U.S. state of Idaho. He has held office since 2022, he became more active in the Republican party in 2010. He represents Idaho's 8th district, representing Boise, Custer, Elmore, and Valley counties. His political career began when he ran for the first of four terms and served as precinct committeeman for the Elmore County Republican Party. He was elected vice-chair of the county party in 2014 and served as Legislative District 23 Chair from 2014-2016.

Schroeder was raised in Kamiah, Idaho, and served in the Idaho Army National Guard from 1986 to 2007. He was a regional recruiting supervisor while serving in the Idaho National Guard. He graduated from Kamiah High School (1984); attended University of Idaho (1986-1989).

Schroeder is an atheist. He supports more power for local governments rather than inflexible state mandates.

References 

People from Kamiah, Idaho
Republican Party Idaho state senators
21st-century American politicians
Year of birth missing (living people)
Living people
University of Idaho alumni